The 2022–23 WE League Cup is the 1st season of the WE League Cup, a women's football cup tournament that will be contested annually between WE League clubs. As the league have as of the 2022–23 season only 11 clubs featuring in the tournament and the plan was to make a group stage between the knockouts, it was necessary that six teams featured in a group, and five in another. The winner of each group got a ticket to the final, which will be contested by Urawa Red Diamonds and Tokyo Verdy Beleza. Despite the tournament refers to itself as if it was played between two different years, the tournament starts and ends on 2022, as the "–23" refers to the Japan professional women's football season on the WE League, which starts in 2022 and (actually) ends on 2023. The final of this edition will be played on 1 October 2022.

Schedule

Group stage

Group A

Group B

Final

Awards

Top scorers

TV broadcasting
BS TV Tokyo Corporation (final match only)

Internet live streaming
 (all matches)

See also
 Japan Football Association (JFA)
 2023 in Japanese football
 2022–23 WE League season
 2023 Nadeshiko League
 2023 Empress's Cup

References

External links
2022–23 Matches, weleague.jp 
 2022–23 Standings, weleague.jp 
2022–23 Final Result, data.weleague.jp 

WE League Cup

Seasons in Japanese women's football
2022 in Japanese women's football
2023 in Japanese women's football